is a retired Japanese male volleyball player. He used to be a part of the Japan men's national volleyball team. On club level, he only played for JTEKT Stings since 2012. On 9 April 2021, the club announced that he would retire after the 69th Kurowashiki All Japan Volleyball Tournament, but it was cancelled due to COVID-19 pandemic.

Awards

Club team 
2012–13 V.Challenge League —  Champion, with JTEKT Stings
2019–20 V. League 1 —  Champion, with JTEKT Stings
2020–21 the Japanese Emperor's Cup —  Champion, with JTEKT Stings

References

External links
 profile at FIVB.org

1990 births
Living people
Japanese men's volleyball players
People from Nagano Prefecture
Sportspeople from Nagano Prefecture
Aichi University alumni
21st-century Japanese people